John Lewis  (1935–1994) was Archdeacon of North-West Europe from 1982 to 1993.

Lewis was educated at Quarry Bank Grammar School for Boys, Liverpool; Worcester College, Oxford; and Ridley Hall, Cambridge. He was ordained deacon in 1960 and priest in 1961.  After a curacy at St Nicholas, Sutton, St Helens he served in Brussels, Montreux and The Hague.

References

1939 births
Alumni of Worcester College, Oxford
Alumni of Ridley Hall, Cambridge
Archdeacons of North West Europe
1994 deaths
21st-century Anglican priests
20th-century English Anglican priests
Officers of the Order of the British Empire